The chestnut-crowned sparrow-weaver (Plocepasser superciliosus) is a species of bird in the family Ploceidae.

It is found in Africa south of the Sahara, from Senegal and Gambia to Eritrea, Ethiopia and western Kenya.

References

External links
 Species text in Weaver Watch.
Chestnut-crowned sparrow-weaver on the Internet Bird Collection

chestnut-crowned sparrow-weaver
Birds of Sub-Saharan Africa
chestnut-crowned sparrow-weaver
Taxonomy articles created by Polbot
chestnut-crowned sparrow-weaver